Kiln (often typeset as KILN) is a Michigan-based Ambient studio trio that is a reincarnation of ambient group Fibreforms.

Discography
Treedrums as Fibreforms (Earthtone, 1996)
Earthtone Colectiv 7" as Fibreforms w/ Owleye and Waterwheel (Earthtone/Mind Expansion, 1996)
Panchroma as Waterwheel (Alley Sweeper, 1997)
Stone EP as Fibreforms (Roomtone, 1997)
Kiln EP (Roomtone, 1997)
Holo (Thalassa, 1998)
Ampday (Thalassa, 2000)
Thermals (Self-released, 2001; Infraction re-release, 2005)
Sunbox (Ghostly International, 2004)
Twinewheel - Lost-Sides and Dusty-Gems 1994-2005 (Division Sound, 2005)
Holo [Re/Lux] (Re-release, independent, 2007)
Vaporbend EP (Ghostly International, 2007)
Dusker (Ghostly International, 2007)
meadow:watt (Ghostly International, 2013)
Astral Welder (Ghostly International, 2020)

Line-up
Kevin Hayes - drums, samplingKirk Marrison - treated guitar, acoustic guitar, effect loops, keyboardClark Rehberg III - treated guitar, effect loopsBrady Kish - bass guitar, double bass (session musician)

In Media
Kiln was mentioned in a Radiolab music special on May 14, 2008.

In 2013 the group contributed three songs to the PlayStation game Hohokum.

References

External links
Official Website
Official MySpace
Kiln @ Ghostly International

Musical groups from Michigan
1994 establishments in Michigan